The 1898 Kansas State Aggies football team represented Kansas State Agricultural College—now known as Kansas State University—as an independent during the 1898 college football season. Led by Billy P. Williamson in his first and only season as head coach, the Aggies compiled a record of 1–1–2.

Schedule

References

Kansas State
Kansas State Wildcats football seasons
Kansas State Aggies football